Gymnosteris parvula is a flowering plant in the phlox family known by the common name smallflower gymnosteris. It is native to the western United States from California to Montana. This is a small annual herb growing a thin green to red-colored stem only a few centimeters tall. There are no leaves; the word gymnosteris comes from the Greek for "naked stem". Atop the stem is a large, fleshy inflorescence with red-tinged green bracts that serve as leaves. Within the lobular inflorescence are one to five small flowers, each less than a centimeter long. The yellow-throated flower has yellow or white oval-shaped lobes with pointed tips. It is self-pollinating.

External links
Jepson eFlora
NatureServe
CalPhotos

Polemoniaceae
Flora of the Western United States